Jal Mahal is a 1980 Hindi-language thriller film, produced by R. K. Soral under the Suyog Films banner and directed by Raghunath Jhalani. It stars Jeetendra, Rekha and music composed by R. D. Burman.

Plot 
The film begins at Jal Mahal Jaipur, Ravi an advocate, and friend of its in-charge Shankar is a frequenter of his house. One night, he finds something suspicious at Jal Mahal where he rescues a girl Namitha from suicide in an abyss. In two days, he spots are as a ‘’Hippie’’ accused in a drug case. Ravi acquits, boosts her spirit, and falls for her. Ravi is the son of Public Prosecutor Devendra Pratap Singh a top tier in the society, who also approves of his love affair. Besides, Rajesh Tagore, a man who holds a family feud with Devendra Pratap invites them to a party where Ravi is startled to view Namitha as his wife. He rebukes her but cools after perceiving that Rajesh has forcibly knitted and bedeviled for her wealth. Thus, Ravi decides to marry her which is opposed by Devendra Pratap. So, Namitha kills herself by jumping from Jal Mahal.

The incident makes a high impact on Ravi, so, as a vagrant, he roams around pilgrimage. Accordingly, he detects Namitha as a saint Gayatri which muddles him. Forthwith, her father Dindayal divulges to Ravi that Gayatri is only his Namitha whose true identity is Rekha. In reality, they walked into the trap of Rajesh who extorted them all to ruin Devendra Pratap’s family. Further, the woman who died at Jal Mahal is his real wife Namitha whom he slaughtered for the wealth. Then, he plotted to kill them too but fortunately, they escaped. Listening to it, Ravi moves for Rekha, when she is abducted by a person under the veil. So, Ravi rushes to his father for guidance. Besides, Rajesh is hauled by the man in the veil showing Rekha’s existence. Surprisingly, he turns as Shankar swindled Ravi by whisking with Rajesh. Afterward, being ruse by him he made this play. At last, Devendra Pratap gamely ceases their ploy. Finally, the movie ends on a happy note with the marriage of Ravi & Rekha.

Cast 
Jeetendra as Ravi
Rekha as Rekha / Namita / Gayatri
Pran as Devendra Pratap Singh
Deven Verma as Shankar
Rajesh Behl as Rajesh Thakur
Manmohan Krishna as Dindayal
Chand Usmani as Shanti
Jayshree T. as Saroj
Jagdeep as Munshi Aashiq Hussain Dildaar

Soundtrack 
Lyrics: Majrooh Sultanpuri

References 

1980s Hindi-language films
1980 films
Films scored by R. D. Burman